Q'asiri (Aymara for bawler, also spelled Khasiri) is a  mountain in the Cordillera Real in the Bolivian Andes. It lies in the La Paz Department, Murillo Province, at the border of the La Paz Municipality and the Palca Municipality. Q'asiri is situated south of the mountains Sirk'i Qullu and Jathi Qullu, north-west of the mountain Sura Qullu and north-east of the mountain Ch'iyar Qullu. Q'asiri lies between the lakes Q'asiri Quta ("Q'asiri lake", Khasiri Kkota) in the north-east and Jach'a Q'asiri Quta ("big Q'asiri lake", Laguna Jachcha Khasiri) in the south-west.

References 

Mountains of La Paz Department (Bolivia)